Ju Jong-gwan (born March 2, 1971) is a South Korean sprint canoer who competed in the early 1990s. At the 1992 Summer Olympics in Barcelona, he was eliminated in the repechages of the K-2 500 m event and in the heats of the K-4 1000 m event, and did not finish in the heats of the K-2 1000 m event.

External links
Sports-Reference.com profile

1971 births
Canoeists at the 1992 Summer Olympics
Living people
Olympic canoeists of South Korea
South Korean male canoeists